Down Two Then Left is the eighth album by singer Boz Scaggs, released in 1977. The album peaked at No. 11 on the Billboard 200.

Track listing
All tracks composed by Boz Scaggs; except where indicated.

Side One
"Still Falling for You" – 3:52
"Hard Times" – 4:26
"A Clue" – 3:53
"Whatcha Gonna Tell Your Man" (Scaggs, Jai Winding) – 3:50
"We're Waiting" (Michael Omartian, Scaggs) – 6:19

Side Two
"Hollywood" (Omartian, Scaggs) – 3:08
"Then She Walked Away" (Omartian, Scaggs) – 4:04
"Gimme the Goods" (Omartian, Scaggs) – 4:11
"1993" (Omartian, Scaggs) – 4:01
"Tomorrow Never Came/Tomorrow Never Came (Reprise)" – 4:38

Singles released from the album were "Hard Times"/"We're Waiting" and "Hollywood"/"A Clue". Some copies of the "Hard Times" single bear a credit for this album under the title Still Falling for You.

Charts

Weekly charts

Year-end charts

Certifications

Personnel 

 Boz Scaggs – lead vocals, backing vocals (1, 5), guitar solo (2, 4)
 Ray Parker Jr. – guitar 
 Steve Lukather – guitar solo (3, 8)
 Jay Graydon – guitar, guitar solo (7)
 Michael Omartian – keyboards, synthesizers, accordion (1), marimba (1), horn arrangements, string arrangements, conductor
 Jai Winding – acoustic piano (4)
 David Hungate – bass (1)
 Scott Edwards – bass (2-10)
 Jeff Porcaro – drums, Syndrum, timbales (8)
 Bobbye Hall – bongos (1), congas (8)
 Victor Feldman – claves (2), vibraphone (6)
 Alan Estes – congas (4)
 Don Menza – saxophone
 Fred Selden – saxophone, flute
 Ernie Watts – saxophone
 Dana Hughes – trombone
 Chuck Findley – trumpet, flugelhorn solo (5)
 Steve Madaio – trumpet
 Barbara Korn – French horn
 David Duke – French horn
 Sidney Sharp – concertmaster
 Carolyn Willis – backing vocals (1, 5-7), voices (verses, 4)
 Jim Gilstrap – backing vocals (2)
 John Lehman – backing vocals (2, 3)
 Zedric Turnbough – backing vocals (2)
 Venetta Fields – backing vocals (3)
 Roy Galloway – backing vocals (3)
 Phyllis Saint James – backing vocals (3, 7)
 Terry Evans – backing vocals (4)
 Bobby King – backing vocals (4)
 Eldridge King – backing vocals (4)
 Julia Tillman Waters – backing vocals (6)
 Myrna Matthews – backing vocals (6, 7)
 Stan Farber – backing vocals (9)
 Jim Haas – backing vocals (9)

Production 
Producer – Joe Wissert
Engineer – Tom Perry
Mastered by Mike Reese at The Mastering Lab (Los Angeles, California).
Design – Nancy Donald
Photography – Guy Bourdin (features the then-shuttered Romanoff's restaurant)
Management – Irving Azoff

References

External links
 Down Two Then Left lyrics
 Down Two Then Left magazine ad

Boz Scaggs albums
1977 albums
Albums produced by Joe Wissert
Columbia Records albums